The Benedict Fenwick School (or Sister Clara Muhammad School) is a 1912 historic school building at 150 Magnolia Street in Boston, Massachusetts. The Classical Revival brick school building was designed by Boston architect James E. McLaughlin, who also designed Fenway Park, the Commonwealth Armory in Boston, and the Hudson Armory in Hudson, Massachusetts. It was named for Benedict Fenwick, the second bishop of the Roman Catholic Archdiocese of Boston. The city used it as a school until 1981. It was purchased by the American Muslim Mission and opened the following year as the Sister Clara Muhammad School, named for Clara Muhammad, the first wife of Nation of Islam founder Elijah Muhammad. In 1999, it was acquired by a developer and converted to housing.

The building was listed on the National Register of Historic Places in 2004. It is listed on the Massachusetts State Register of Historic Places.

See also
National Register of Historic Places listings in southern Boston, Massachusetts

References

External links

School buildings completed in 1912
School buildings on the National Register of Historic Places in Massachusetts
Schools in Boston
National Register of Historic Places in Boston
Dorchester, Boston
1912 establishments in Massachusetts